Weijers is a Dutch surname. Its origin may be patronymic (son of "Weijer", a now rare given name related to Wichard), toponymic (from wijer, modern Dutch vijver, meaning "pond"), or occupational (related to modern Dutch weiden, i.e. to let graze, for a shepherd).  Variant forms are Waijers, Weijer, Weyers, Wijers and Wyers. People with the surname include:

Bibiane Weijers (born 1988), Dutch tennis player
 (born 1987), Dutch writer and journalist
 (born 1964), Dutch organiser of domino projects
Weyers
Carole Weyers (born 1984), Belgian actress
Denise Weyers, South Africa cricketer
Howard Weyers (born 1934), American football player and assistant coach
Marius Weyers (born 1945), South African actor
Wijers
Clemens Wijers (born 1983), Dutch heavy metal keyboardist and songwriter
Hans Wijers (born 1951), Dutch executive and Minister of Economic Affairs 1994-98
Louwrien Wijers (born 1941), Dutch contemporary artist and writer

See also
 Jeroen van de Weijer (born 1965), Dutch linguist
 Weyer (disambiguation)
 Wyer
 Guido Weijers, Dutch Stand-up comedian

References

Dutch-language surnames
Patronymic surnames
Surnames of Dutch origin